Germanium(II) hydroxide, normally written as Ge(OH)2, is a poorly characterised compound, sometimes called hydrous germanium(II) oxide or germanous hydroxide. It was first reported by Winkler in 1886.

Properties and preparation
Germanium(II) hydroxide is formed as a white or yellow precipitate when base is added to solutions containing GeII, produced for example by the reduction of an acid solution of germanium dioxide, GeO2, with hypophosphorous acid, H3PO2, or alternatively by hydrolysis of GeCl2. The initial precipitate, which has no definite stoichiometry, can be represented by GeO·xH2O, Ge(OH)2·xH2O, or loosely Ge(OH)2. It is only slightly soluble in water or alkali and not appreciably soluble in perchloric acid, HClO4, but is soluble in hydrochloric acid, HCl. On digestion with sodium hydroxide, NaOH, it yields a brown insoluble compound, which after drying in vacuo forms a brown pyrophoric substance with the approximate stoichiometry of (HGe)2O3. On the basis of the infrared spectrum, (HGe)2O3 may contain a germanium hydrogen bond, Ge-H.

References

Germanium(II) compounds
Hydroxides